The Flint Phantoms were a professional indoor football team based in Flint, Michigan. The Phantoms joined the Continental Indoor Football League (CIFL) in 2008 as an expansion team. They were the second professional indoor football team to be based in Flint, with the first being the Flint Flames of the original Indoor Football League. The Michigan Pirates played a home playoff game in Flint, in 2007, with the idea of moving there, but the team folded after the 2007 season. The Phantoms played their home games at the Perani Arena and Event Center in Flint, Michigan.

History
With the limited success of Perani Arena as the playoff home for the Michigan Pirates, Pete Norager, one of the owners of the Pirates, decided to start a replacement team in Flint, and the formation of the Phantoms was announced on December 18, 2007.  In February 2008, Norager withdrew from owning the team.  The Perani Group operated the team pending the selection of a new owner with a temporary investment group. Because of poor attendance, payments to players were delayed near the end of the 2008 season, and some players left the team because of other commitments or disgruntlement over late pay. The Phantoms approached their last game of 2008 with a roster of just 9 or 10 or maybe 50 and looked to semi-pro teams for additional players.  On the day of the game, only 11 players were available (with 16 required to field a team), forcing the Phantoms to forfeit.

The team has sat out the 2009 season but still is still considering rejoining the CIFL.

Season-By-Season 

|-
|2008 || 1 || 11 || 0 || 4th Atlantic West || --

2008 Season Schedule

2008 CIFL Standings

References

External links 
Official website
CIFL Alignment, announcing the team

Former Continental Indoor Football League teams
Sports in Flint, Michigan
American football teams in Michigan
American football teams established in 2008
American football teams disestablished in 2008